Louis Renault may refer to:

 Louis Renault (jurist) (1843–1918), a French jurist and educator, recipient of the Nobel Prize for Peace
 Louis Renault (industrialist) (1877–1944), a French industrialist and pioneer of the automobile industry
 A character from the film Casablanca